Wisław Zabawa was a Polish clergyman and bishop for the Roman Catholic Archdiocese of Kraków. He became ordained in 1231. He was appointed bishop in 1231. He died in 1242.

References

13th-century Roman Catholic bishops in Poland
1242 deaths